Thomas Comber (1575 – 28 February 1653) was an English linguist. He was the Dean of Carlisle and Master of Trinity College, Cambridge.

He was born at Shermanbury, Sussex about the end of the sixteenth century, the 12th child of Sir Richard Comber, the Clarenceux King of Arms at the Herald Court. He was educated at Horsham and Trinity College, Cambridge. He was an expert linguist fluent in Greek and Latin, and familiar with several other languages. In 1623 on his return from travels on the continent, he was elected King's Chaplain and soon afterwards Dean of Carlisle. In 1631, he was elected Master of Trinity College and Vice-Chancellor of the University of Cambridge. At the outbreak of the English civil war, he sided with the royalists and was hounded by the Puritans, who imprisoned him in 1642 until his death on 28 February 1653.

Comber married Susan, a widow and daughter of Freston of Norwich. After Comber's death she married Thomas Sclater.

References

Deans of Carlisle
1575 births
1653 deaths
Masters of Trinity College, Cambridge
People from Shermanbury
Alumni of Trinity College, Cambridge
Linguists from England
Cavaliers
17th-century English Anglican priests
Vice-Chancellors of the University of Cambridge